The third season of the reality television series Black Ink Crew: Chicago aired on VH1 from July 19, 2017, until December 6, 2017. It chronicles the daily operations and staff drama at an African American owned and operated tattoo shop, 9MAG, located in Chicago, Illinois.

Main cast
 Ryan Henry
 Katrina Jackson
 Charmaine Walker
 Phor Brumfield
 Van Johnson
 Danielle Jamison
 Don Brumfield

Recurring cast
 Ashley P
 Cobra Kat
 JR Diaz
 NeekBay
 Nikki
 Rachel
 Liliana
 Jenn

Episodes

References

2017 American television seasons
Black Ink Crew